Yelsemia is a genus of smut fungi in the family Melanopsichiaceae containing four species.

References

External links

Ustilaginomycotina